San Giorgio in Bosco is a comune (municipality) in the Province of Padua in the Italian region Veneto, located about  northwest of Venice and about  northwest of Padua. 

San Giorgio in Bosco borders the following municipalities: Campo San Martino, Cittadella, Fontaniva, Grantorto, Piazzola sul Brenta, Tombolo, Villa del Conte.

References

Cities and towns in Veneto